Sylvie Groulx is a Québécois documentary film director. She began her career in 1976, with her films said to reflect societal change. In 1982, she helped develop the Rendez-vous du cinéma québécois, and in the 1990s, started to work in fiction film. In 2000, she returned to documentary and won the Jutra in 2006, for La classe de madame Lise.

Career
Groulx's first feature film was Le Grand Remue-ménage/The Big Sweep in 1978. Her first fiction film was 1995's J'aime, j'aime pas/Love me, Love me not. Her return to documentary came with À l'ombre d'Hollywood/In the Shadow of Hollywood in 2000, described as "a meditation on the future of cultural diversity and auteur cinema". She also wrote the screenplay for these two films, as well as L'Homme trop pressé prend son thé à la fourchette/The Hasty Man Drinks His Tea with a Fork  (2003), a part-fiction, part-documentary film that "shows the absurdity of a society dedicated to the cult of speed at all costs", and La classe de madame Lise (2006). She made shorter documentaries in later years, including 2011's La Passion selon Gabriel and Sur les étages in 2013. Her work often focuses on loss and forgetting values.

References

Living people
Film directors from Quebec
Year of birth missing (living people)
Place of birth missing (living people)
Canadian screenwriters in French
Canadian women screenwriters
20th-century Canadian screenwriters
21st-century Canadian screenwriters